Chromosome 4 Open Reading Frame 45 (C4orf45) is a protein which in humans is encoded by the C4orf45 gene. It is predicted to be localized in the cytoplasm and nucleus of a cell

Gene 
The C4or45 gene is found on chromosome 4 (4q32.1) from 158,893,134 to 159,082,885, spanning 189,752 bases, and is oriented on the minus strand. The other names for this gene are FLJ25371 and LOC152940.

mRNA 
There are four total mRNA transcript variants of C4orf45. The most common C4orf45 mRNA transcript is 1263 nucleotides in length and contains 5 exons. The coding sequence spans from nucleotide 134 to 694. In RNA-seq datasets, C4orf45 has been observed to be ubiquitously expressed at low levels across all tissues, with greatest expression in the testes.

Protein 
The C4orf45 protein produced from the most common mRNA transcript is 186 amino acids in length. Its theoretical isoelectric point is 9.97 and its molecular weight is 21.6 kDa. The protein contains a domain of unknown function, DUF4562. It is also predicted to contain a forkhead-associated (FHA) domain and a SRC homology 3 (SH3) domain. According to the structural prediction from AlphaFold, the C4orf45 protein's tertiary structure consists primarily of alpha helices.

Sub-cellular localization 
The human C4orf45 protein is predicted to contain a nuclear localization signal at its C-terminus, indicating it is a nuclear protein. The protein is also predicted to be found in the cytoplasm.

Post-translational modifications 

The human C4orf45 protein is predicted to contain 4 phosphorylation sites. It is also predicted to contain two sumoylation sites, which are common in nuclear proteins and may aid in sub-cellular localization of the protein. C4orf45 is predicted to contain 8 O-linked beta-N-acetylglucosamine (O-β-GlcNA) attachment sites, which may play a role in regulating transcription, signaling, and protein-protein interactions of C4orf45. Five of the O-β-GlcNA attachment sites are also predicted to be phosphorylation sites. The C-terminus of the human C4orf45 protein is predicted to contain two acetylation sites.

Homology

Orthologs 
Orthologs of C4orf45 are found in mammals, birds, amphibians, fish, and some invertebrates, but not in plants, fungi, or protists.

Evolution 
C4orf45 seems to have first appeared in invertebrates. When comparing the date of divergence (MYA) versus corrected sequence divergence for C4orf45, cytochrome c, and fibrinogen alpha, it appears that C4orf45 is evolving at an intermediate rate compared to the fast evolving fibriongen alpha and the slow evolving cytochrome c.

Function

Interacting proteins 
The human C4orf45 protein has been experimentally shown to interact with BANP (BTG3 associated nuclear protein) and PFDN5 (prefoldin subunit 5). It also interacts with NEK4 (NIMA related kinase 4), which is a serine/threonine protein kinase that is required for normal entry into replicative senescence.

Clinical significance 
C4orf45 had been identified as part of four different driver gene sets in the development of ovarian cancer. C4orf45 has also been identified in the development of multiple myeloma (MM). A study found a reciprocal translocation between a breakpoint in chromosome 8 downstream of the MYC gene and a breakpoint in chromosome 4 in the C4orf45 gene in a patient with MM. An intronic variant found in C4orf45 suggests that the gene may contain variants associated with the development of cardiovascular disease in Mexican Americans. A cross-trait meta analysis study found a SNP at the C4orf45 gene loci that is shared between late-onset Alzheimer's disease and snoring. Another study discovered that the C4orf45 gene was altered by a copy number variant (CNV) in each member of a family that was diagnosed with familial schizophrenia (SCZ), indicating the gene's possible involvement in SCZ.

References